West Virginia Route 310 is a north–south state highway located in northern West Virginia. The southern terminus of the route is at U.S. Route 50 in Grafton. The northern terminus is at U.S. Route 19 in Fairmont.

WV 310 is a two-lane road that traverses a mostly country setting, with sharp turns and occasional steep inclines.  It runs through the unincorporated town of Quiet Dell (Marion County) and also provides access to Valley Falls State Park.  The southern portion is located in Taylor County and the northern portion is located in Marion County.  It crosses the county line near the entrance to Valley Falls State Park.

Virtually all of the residences in the immediate area are occupied by a single family.  Homes generally have large amounts of acreage that commonly back up to wooded areas.  WV 310 runs through an area that has seen moderate growth with the development of some upscale neighborhoods such as South Point, Bunners Ridge, Timber Ridge, and Rock Lake.

WV-310 is also a main thoroughfare for individuals traveling between East Fairmont and Grafton.

WV 310 was formerly County Route 31 in Marion County and County Route 5 in Taylor County. The route's northern terminus was originally at US 250 in Fairmont, but it was extended in 2017 over the new Third Street bridge over Coal Run to US 19.

Major intersections

References

310
Transportation in Marion County, West Virginia
Transportation in Taylor County, West Virginia